OKL may refer to:

Oakleigh Park railway station, London, National Rail station code
Oberkommando der Luftwaffe, the air force High Command of the Third Reich
Olive Kettering Library, the library of Antioch College, Ohio
Oberste Kriegsleitung (Supreme War Command), the supreme command of the Central Powers in the latter part of the First World War